The XIPS-25, or 25-cm Xenon Ion Propulsion System, is a gridded ion thruster manufactured by L-3 Communications. XIPS-25 engine is used on Boeing 702 class satellites for station-keeping as well as orbit-raising.

Specifications

References

Ion engines